Dónall Ó Héalai (born 1987) is an Irish actor and voice actor. He was named a 2020 Screen International Star of Tomorrow and one to watch in 2021 by The Irish Examiner.

Early life and education
Ó Héalai was born in the Gaeltacht village of Inverin, County Galway and grew up in Inverin and Spiddal. He began acting at the age of 14 at a local youth club. He completed his secondary education as a boarding student at St Jarlath's College in Tuam.

He graduated from Maynooth University. He was awarded the Dr. H.H Stewart Literary Prize during his studies. He went on to train at the Stella Adler Studio of Acting in New York and Bow Street Academy in Dublin.

Career
In 2006, Ó Héalai made his onscreen debut as a teenager in the recurring role of Jeaic in season 1 of the TG4 coming-of-age family series Aifric.

Ó Héalai played Otis in the 2019 American psychological thriller Impossible Monsters. That same year, he starred as Colmán Sharkey in the Irish-language period drama film Arracht, which won Best Irish film at 2020 Dublin International Film Festival (DIFF) and the Audience Award at the 2020 Glasgow Film Festival. In addition to receiving critical acclaim, Ó Héalai won the Aer Lingus Discovery Award at the DIFF as well as receiving a Best Actor nomination at the IFTAs.

Ó Héalaí stars as John Cunliffe in the Irish-language film Foscadh, an adaptation of the social novel The Thing About December by Donal Ryan. Foscadh is the Irish submission for Best International Feature Film at the 94th Academy Awards.

Other ventures
A native speaker of Irish, Ó Héalaí founded the cultural initiative Celtic Consciousness and, in 2018, gave a TEDxBerkeley talk on the Irish Language and Beauty.

Filmography

Film

Television

Video games

Music videos

Awards and nominations

References

External links

Living people
1987 births
21st-century Irish male actors
Alumni of Maynooth University
Alumni of the Bow Street Academy
Irish male film actors
Irish male stage actors
Irish male television actors
Male actors from Galway (city)
People educated at St Jarlath's College